George W. Leland (1834 – March 18, 1880) was a Union Navy sailor in the American Civil War and a recipient of the U.S. military's highest decoration, the Medal of Honor, for helping to free his grounded ship.

Born in 1834 in Savannah, Georgia, Leland was still living in that city when he joined the Navy.

On November 16, 1863, Lehigh was in Charleston Harbor providing support for Union troops on shore when the ship ran aground on a sand bar and came under heavy fire from Fort Moultrie. Both times, the cable snapped due to friction and hostile fire. Officers were about to give an "abandon ship" order when three more sailors, Landsman Frank S. Gile, Landsman William Williams, and Seaman Horatio Nelson Young, volunteered to make one more attempt. This last effort was successful and Nahant was able to tow Lehigh off the sandbar to safety. For this action, all five sailors involved in the operation were awarded the Medal of Honor on April 16, 1864.

Leland's official Medal of Honor citation reads:
Serving on board the U.S.S. Lehigh, Charleston Harbor, 16 November 1863, during the hazardous task of freeing the Lehigh, which had grounded, and was under heavy enemy fire from Fort Moultrie. Rowing the small boat which was used in the hazardous task of transferring hawsers from the Lehigh to the Nahant, Leland twice succeeded in making the trip, only to find that each had been in vain when the hawsers were cut by enemy fire and chaffing.

Leland died on March 18, 1880, at age 45 or 46 and was buried in Lewiston, Maine.

See also

List of American Civil War Medal of Honor recipients: G–L

References

External links

1834 births
1880 deaths
People from Savannah, Georgia
People of Georgia (U.S. state) in the American Civil War
Union Navy sailors
United States Navy Medal of Honor recipients
American Civil War recipients of the Medal of Honor